Clitostethus oculatus, the eyed lady, is a species of dusky lady beetle in the family Coccinellidae.

References

Coccinellidae
Beetles described in 1917
Taxa named by Willis Blatchley